The Pontifical Catholic University of Campinas (PUC-Campinas) is a private and non-profit Catholic university, located in Campinas, the second largest city in the State of São Paulo. The university is maintained by the Catholic Archdiocese of Campinas.

History
Founded in June 1941, with the first college teaching Philosophy, Science and Literature, it became a full university in 1955. The title of Pontifical University was granted by Pope Paul VI in 1972.

With three campuses in Campinas, the university has approximately 20,000 students enrolled in undergraduate and graduate programs. Undergraduate programs comprise business administration, system analysis, architecture, arts, accounting, biology, medicine, information science and library science, economics, theology, pharmacy, law, social sciences, literature, physical education, nursing, dentistry, physical therapy, speech therapy, nutrition science, engineering (civil, electrical, environmental, sanitary and computing), philosophy, geography, journalism, history, pedagogy, psychology, publicity, public relations, international relations, chemistry, social services, occupational therapy and tourism.

The Central Campus is the main building, and the Building of Arts, in which the University started its activities. Campus I is the largest space in PUC-Campinas, where more than 50% of students at the university study are, and where the Rectory is located. The land of campus I was donated by sisters Vera and Ana Beatriz, daughters to the agronomist Caio Guimarães Pinto, former owner of the Santa Candida Farm, who had the dream to build a university. The construction of the buildings began when the land was donated in 1970. Three years later, the Institute of Arts, Communications and Tourism (IACT) and the School of Physical Education (FAEF) became operational. The campus was opened in 1976.

The schools are Centre for Economics and Business Administration (CEA), Centre for Mathematical, Environmental and Technology Sciences (CEATEC), Centre for Applied Social and Human Sciences (CCHSA), including the college of Law, and Centre for Language and Communication (CLC).

Campus II is named "Centro de Ciências da Vida" (Centre for Life Sciences) and it is known as the "Health City". The CCV's programs comprise the following colleges: Biologic Sciences, Pharmacy, Nursing, Physiotherapy, Speech Therapy, Medicine, Nutrition, Dentistry, Psychology and Occupational Therapy. Furthermore, it has 33 laboratories, outpatient services of physiotherapy and occupational therapy, speech therapy clinics and dental and physiotherapy services.

On the same campus is the Celso Pierro Hospital and Maternity (HMCP), which has 340 beds and 35 medical specialties. Every year, 450 thousand patients are treated by the Unified Health System (SUS). PUC-Campinas and the University of São Paulo are the best universities in Brazil when it comes to Health.

The Celso Pierro Hospital has 340 beds, being 240 for the covenant of the Unified Health System (SUS) and 100 for HMOs and private individuals distributed in inpatient units.

See also
Brazil University Rankings
Universities and Higher Education in Brazil

References

External links
Official website 

Educational institutions established in 1941
1941 establishments in Brazil
Education in Campinas
Nursing schools in Brazil
Universities and colleges in São Paulo (state)
Pontifical universities in Brazil